Bernard Lavalette (20 January 1926 – 14 December 2019) was a French film and television actor.

Partial filmography

 Sans famille (1958) - Le brigadier
 The Bureaucrats (1959) - Van Der Hogen
 La Belle Américaine (1961) - Le ministre du commerce
 Tales of Paris (1962) - Richard (segment "Antonia")
 L'assassin est dans l'annuaire (1962) - Martel
 Un clair de lune à Maubeuge (1962) - Le présentateur télé
 Heaven Sent (1963) - Prefect of Police
 Comment épouser un premier ministre (1964) - Le commissaire
 Thomas the Impostor (1965) - Le docteur Gentil
 Les malabars sont au parfum (1966)
 Asterix the Gaul (1967) - (voice)
 Salut Berthe! (1968) - Labarasse
 Le gendarme se marie (1968) - Le professeur de danse
 Asterix and Cleopatra (1968) - Le narrateur / Amonbofis (voice)
 Flash Love (1968) - Le rédacteur en chef
 La grande maffia... (1971) - Le notaire
 Le Viager (1972) - Le député-maire de Saint-Tropez
 Le permis de conduire (1974) - Le P.D.G.
 The Holes (1974)
 Les murs ont des oreilles (1974) - L'éditeur
 Impossible... pas français (1974)
 Maître Pygmalion (1975)
 The Twelve Tasks of Asterix (1976) - Le préfet (voice)
 The Apprentice Heel (1977) - Roger Desmare, l'avocat d'Antoine
 Pourquoi? (1977) - Un spectateur
 La grande frime (1977) - Le professeur
 Dis bonjour à la dame!.. (1977) - Le proviseur
 La ville des silences (1979) - Franger
 La Gueule de l'autre (1979) - Le comte de Chalosse
 Les phallocrates (1980) - Le préfet
 Les surdoués de la première compagnie (1981) - Colonel Varalin
 Cinq jours en juin (1989) - Le patron de l'hôtel

References

Bibliography
 Ince, Katie. Georges Franju. Manchester University Press, 2005.

External links

1926 births
2019 deaths
French male film actors
French male television actors
Male actors from Paris